Elect the Dead is the debut album by rock musician Serj Tankian, lead singer and founding member of Armenian-American metal band System of a Down. It was released on October 22, 2007. Alongside Tankian appears Armenian-American coloratura Ani Maldjian, drummers John Dolmayan (System of a Down) and Brain (Primus, Guns N' Roses), Dan Monti on guitars, as well as a string section featuring Antonio Pontarelli.

Marketing
The initial single from the album was a two-track promo including "Empty Walls" and "The Unthinking Majority", released on September 10, 2007. Tankian immediately appeared on MTV's "You Rock the Deuce" program. Meanwhile, a music video of "Feed Us" was released in Sweden and on UK MTV.
The album was released October 22, 2007 and opened at number 4 with 66,000 US units sold according to the Billboard 200 trade listing. 
By September 2010, the album had sold 319,000 copies total.

Music videos of the album's songs were each filmed by discrete directors. Tankian revealed: "I asked each of the directors for their visual interpretation of my work. They were asked not to write treatments and that they could make whatever they liked. The results have been overwhelmingly amazing". 
Initially some videos were released as limited edition premiums. All videos were later freely offered on Tankian's website and his YouTube channel. Some of these "official videos" were alternate versions released one version at a time, suggesting incrementally evolving narrative.

Collectible versions of the album include an instrumental disc offered by Serjical Strike/Reprise Records, and the "final master" from Reprise intended for specific journalists and reviewers. That embargoed disc was labeled "Smart Talk" [a coded reference to the artist's own name]. 
Previously an undated, un-mastered 'Smart Talk' promo featured these same 'final versions' of the songs, but the sequence of tracks ten and eleven was juxtaposed.

Production
Tankian stated that some of these songs were new, and others had developed earlier. An acoustic version of "Blue" was released on the album's special edition bonus disc. The original version appeared on System of a Down's fourth demo tape but had no other recordings of the song were known to exist.

The title track was also recorded by System of a Down during the recording sessions for Mezmerize and Hypnotize but this version remains unreleased.

An Elect the Dead tour commenced October 12, 2007 at Chicago's Vic Theater. Tankian cautioned fans this production featured a new band, Flying Cunts of Chaos (a.k.a. The F.C.C.), which was not promoting the System of a Down.

In 2009, Tankian did a symphonic tour with an orchestra in order to perform symphonic renditions of most of the songs from Elect the Dead. A recording of this tour titled Elect the Dead Symphony was released February 23, 2010 in the US.

Track listing

Personnel
 All songs written & performed by Serj Tankian (guitars, bass, piano, vocals, synthesizers, drum programming, melodica, bells)
 All songs recorded at Serjical Strike Studios
 Produced by Serj Tankian
 Engineered by Dan Monti & Serj Tankian
 Mastered by Vlado Meller at Sony Music Studios in New York City

Elect the Dead
 All drums recorded at The Pass in Los Angeles
 Drum engineer Krish Sharma
 Assistant drum engineer Bo Joe
 Drum technician at The Pass Sako Karaian
 Mixed by Neal Avron at Paramount Recording Studios in Los Angeles
 Mix assistant Nicholas Fournier
 Drumming on tracks 1, 3, 7-9, 11 by Brain
 Drumming on track 2 by John Dolmayan
 Drumming on tracks 4 and 5 by Brain and John Dolmayan
 Drum programming on track 6 by Dan Monti
 Additional guitar on tracks 1-4, 6, 8, 11 by Dan Monti
 Additional bass on tracks 2, 6-9, 11 by Dan Monti
 Additional solo guitar on track 5 by Diran Noubar
 Additional vocals on tracks 5 and 9 by Ani Maldjian
 Additional cello on tracks 1, 3, 4, 6, 8, 11, 12 by Cameron Stone
 Additional violin on tracks 1, 3, 4, 6, 8 by Antonio Pontarelli
 Additional synthesizers on track 6 by Dan Monti and Fabrice Favre

Special edition bonus disc
 Drums on track 4 recorded at The Pass in Los Angeles
 Additional engineering on track 1 by Thom Russo
 Drum engineer on track 4 Krish Sharma
 Assistant drum engineer on track 4 Bo Joe
 Drum technician on track 4 Sako Karaian
 Tracks 1-3 mixed by Serj Tankian & Dan Monti
 Track 4 mixed by Neal Avron
 Track 4 mix assistant Nicholas Fournier
 Drumming on track 4 by John Dolmayan
 Violin solo on track 4 by Antonio Pontarelli
 Additional guitars on track 4 by Dan Monti
 Additional violin on tracks 2-4 by Antonio Pontarelli
 Additional cello on tracks 2-4 by Cameron Stone

 A&R Craig Aaronson & George Tonikian
 Original artwork provided by Sako Shahinian
 Album packaging design by Sako Shahinian
 Digipack album packaging design by Keith Aazami
 Photography by Greg Watermann

Charts

References

External links
 Elect the Dead at Serjical Strike Records

2007 debut albums
Reprise Records albums
Serj Tankian albums
Albums produced by Serj Tankian
Serjical Strike Records albums